Martina Gasparovič Bezoušková (born 9 January 1961, Prague) is a Czech theatre and film actress and teacher.

Biography
She was born in Malá Strana, Prague, one of four children of the painter Ema Blažková (1924–2003) and Martin Gasparovič (1923–1989). As a young child, she studied classical ballet in the Ballet Preparatory School of the National Theater, tap danced, and sang in the Czech Radio Children's Choir. She later competed in ballroom dancing.

From 1976–1980 she studied dental laboratory at the Secondary Medical School in Prague.

After graduation, she was admitted to the Department of Dramatic Theater of the Theatre Faculty of the Academy of Performing Arts (DAMU), from which she graduated in 1984. Her teachers there included Jana Hlaváčová.

Since 2014 she has been teaching stage speech at DAMU. Since 2016, she has been teaching two programs at the Faculty of Arts of Charles University in Prague as part of the "University of the Third Age": Speak or not to speak and The road to success is paved with words. In 2018 she began teaching at the Jan Deyl Conservatory and High School, and also at the Prague International Conservatory.

She has been credited in theatre and film as "Martina Gasparovičová", "Martina Gasparovičová-Bezoušková" or "Martina Bezoušková".

Family 
Her husband was Martin Bezouška (born 1955), a Czech screenwriter and dramaturgist. They have four children together.

Selected filmography 
 1982 Na konci diaľnice, name of role: Zuzka, dir. Ján Zeman
 1983 O statečném kováři, Princezna, Babice, Skřet  (princess, scary woman, elf), dir. Petr Švéda 
 1984 Kariéra, gymnastka Miluška (Miluška, the gymnast), dir. Július Matula
 1984 Kouzelníkův návrat,  Jůlinka, dir. Antonín Kachlík
 1984 Oldřich a Božena, Dívka z družiny Boženy (Girl from the company of Bozena), dir.  Otakar Vávra
 1985 Vlak dětství a naděje, Madona, dir.  Karel Kachyňa
 1986 Mladé víno, Jana, Richardova nová přítelkyně (Richard's new girlfriend), dir. Václav Vorlíček
 1987 Nejistá sezóna, Fanynka (fans), dir. Ladislav Smoljak
 1986 Počkej si na bílé štěstí (TV series), Skořepová, dir. Vladimír Blažek
 1987 O houslích krále snů, Markétka, dir. Věra Jordánová
 1988 Anděl svádí ďábla, Společnice (companion), dir. Václav Matějka
 1989  Uzavřený okruh, Karlina kamarádka (friend of Karla), dir. Václav Matějka
 2000 Kytice, Matka (mother), dir. F. A. Brabec
 2007 Bestiář, Tetička (auntie), dir. Irena Pavlásková
 2010 Cesty domů (TV series), Dvořáčková, dir. Jaromír Polišenský, Jiří Adamec
 2010 Bystroletov,  Štererová, dir. Valeri Nikolajev
 2010 Ze závislosti do nezávislosti, Vrchní sestra (Chief nurse), dir. Alan Lederer
 2011 V peřině, Zákaznice (Customer), dir. F. A. Brabec
 2012 Život je ples, Žena z vily Zelenky (Woman from Villa Zelenka), (TV seriál), dir. Petr Slavík
 2014 Doktoři z Počátků (TV series), Oddávající (Marrying clerk), part Soudy a předsudky, dir. Libor Kodad
 2014 Vejška, Docentka (associate professor), dir. Tomáš Vorel
 2015 Doktor Martin  (TV series), Doktorka Eda (Dr Eda), dir. Petr Zahrádka
 2016 Řachanda, Královna (Queen), dir. Marta Ferencová
 2016 Přistoupili?, Průvodčí (conductor), dir. Tereza Pospíšilová

Selected theatre roles

DISK Theatre (1983–1984) 
 Václav Kliment Klicpera, Každý něco pro vlast (Everybody for homeland), name of role: Minka, dir. Jan Burian
 Thornton  Wilder: Naše městečko (Our town), Rebeka Gibbsová (Rebeka Gibbs), dir. Lájos Horváth
 W. Shakespeare: Troilus a Kressida (Troilus and Kressida), Andromache, dir. František Štěpánek
 R. Avermaete: Kravská řež (Cow cut), paní de Fallais (Madame de Fallais), dir. Lájos Horváth
 Josef Čapek, Karel Čapek: Lásky hra osudná (Love game fatal), Isabella, dir. Evžen Němec
 A. Arbuzov: Kruté hry (Cruel games), Ljubasja, dir. Hana Ižofová

Švandovo Theatre at Smíchov (former Realistické divadlo)  (1982–1985) 
	Jean Giraudoux: Ondina, Hraběnka Violanta (Countess Violanta), víla (nymph), dir. Luboš Pistorius

Viola Theatre (1982–1985) 
 Eva Kröschlová (úprava): Staročeské vánoční hry (Old Czech Christmas Games), Anděl (Angel), dir. Eva Kröschlová

Theatre in Řeznická Street 
 Princeznina bota (Princess Shoe), Princezna Jasněnka (Jasněna, the Princess), dir. Jan Marek

Klicpera Theatre (former DVÚ Hradec Králové) (1984–1985) 
 Jerome Chodorov: Dva na schodišti (Two on the staircase), dir. Otakar Prajzner
 Václav Tomšovský: Jak se čerti ženili (How the devils got married), dir. František Bahník
 Karel Čapek: Loupežník (Highwayman), Mimi, dir. Jaromír Staněk

Jaroslav Průcha Theatre (former Středočeské divadlo Kladno – Mladá Boleslav)  (1988–1990) 
 Leonid Andrejev: Ten, který dostává políčky  (The One Who Receives Blows), Consuella, dir. Miloš Horanský
 Carlo Goldoni: Náměstíčko (Square), Gneze, dir. Krystina Taberyová
 Rudyard Kipling: Kniha džungle (The jungle book), Bílý jelen (White deer), dir. Václav Martinec
 F. Vodseďálek: Mojžíš, Princezna Egyptská (Princess of Egypt), dir. Hana Burešová
 Josef Lada: Byl jednou jeden drak (There was once a dragon), Hraběnka Babáčková (Babáčková, the Countess), dir. Karel Brožek
 Aristofanes: Lysistrata, dir. Miloš Horanský
 William Shakespeare: Kupec benátský (The Merchant of Venice), Jessica, Shylockova dcera (Daughter of Shylock), dir. Gerik Císař
 Jean Anouilh: Tomáš Becket (Thomas Becket), dir. Gerik Císař
 Hervé: Mam'zelle Nitouche, Anděl Strážný, Claudine, Důstojník, Klášterní sestra, Tanečnice, (Guardian Angel, Claudine, Officer, Monastery Sister, Dancer),  dir. Hana Burešová

References

Citations

External links 
 Martina Gasparovič Bezoušková on Česko-Slovenská filmová databáze (Czechoslovak film database)
 Martina Gasparovič Bezoušková on Filmová databáze (Film database)
Martina Gasparovič Bezoušková on IMDb

1961 births
Living people
Czech stage actresses
Czech film actresses
20th-century Czech actresses
Academic staff of Charles University